Rössler is a surname and may refer to:
 Fritz Rössler (1912–1987), German Nazi politician
 Günter Rössler (1926–2012), German photographer and photo-journalist 
 Jaroslav Rössler (1902–1990), Czech photographer
 Otto Rössler (born 1940), German biochemist
 Willi Rössler (1924–2007), German fencer

See also
 Rößler
 Roessler
 Roeseler
 Rössler attractor